14 Eridani is a star in the equatorial Eridanus constellation. It has an apparent visual magnitude of 6.143 and is moving closer to the Sun with a radial velocity of around −5 km/s. Proper motion studies indicate that this is an astrometric binary.

It is 1.4 billion years old with 1.3 times the mass of the Sun and 1.5 times the Sun's radius. The star is radiating 3.87 times the luminosity of the Sun from its photosphere at an effective temperature of 6,719 K. The system has been detected as a source of X-ray emission.

References

F-type main-sequence stars
Eridanus (constellation)
Durchmusterung objects
Eridani, 14
020395
015244
0988
Astrometric binaries